The Federal Financial Supervisory Authority better known by its abbreviation BaFin is the financial regulatory authority for Germany. It is an independent federal institution with headquarters in Bonn and Frankfurt and falls under the supervision of the Federal Ministry of Finance. BaFin supervises about 2,700 banks, 800 financial services institutions, and over 700 insurance undertakings.

History

Background

Prudential banking supervision in Germany essentially started as a consequence of the banking crisis of 1931, prior to which the only supervised credit institutions were the public savings banks. Initially the Reichsbank was associated with the supervisory process through a newly established Supervisory Office, but that role was transferred to the Economics Minister  upon a legislative revision in 1939, and the  itself was dissolved in 1944 with its duties taken over by the economics ministry. 

Creation of BaFin and early development

BaFin was formed on 1 May 2002 with the passing of the Financial Services and integration Act on 22 April 2002. The aim of this legislation was to create one integrated financial regulator that covered all financial markets.
BaFin was created by the merger of the three supervisory agencies, namely the BAK for banking, the Federal Supervisory Office for the Securities Trading (BAWe), and the Federal Insurance Supervisory Office (BAV).

This meant there was uniform national supervision of banks, credit institutions, insurance companies, financial service companies, brokers and stock exchanges. This model was designed to provide transparency and manageability and to make sure all financial activity was regulated.

In 2003 changes to the Banking Act (KWG) gave BaFin further responsibility to monitor the creditworthiness of financial institutions and to collect detailed information from those institutions. The aim was to increase customer protection and the reputation of the financial system. It shares responsibility here with the Bundesbank. As of 2015, BaFin is in transition, after major responsibilities for banking supervision shifted to the purview of the European Central Bank in November 2014.

Financial crisis and aftermath

On 19 September 2008, in response to threats from the global financial crisis and following measures taking by the United States, BaFin banned short selling on eleven German finance stocks. These were Aareal Bank, Allianz, AMB Generali, Commerzbank AG, Deutsche Bank, Deutsche Börse, Deutsche Postbank, Hannover Re, Hypo Real Estate, MLP AG and Munich Re. The ban expired on the 31 January 2010 and was not renewed at that time.

On 19 May 2010, in response to 2010 European sovereign debt crisis, BaFin banned naked short selling of credit default swaps on euro-area government bonds until 31 March 2011. At the same time they re-introduced a ban on naked short selling of the previous 10 banks and insurers companies.

In 2019, BaFin banned short-selling in response to accusations of accounting fraud in Wirecard. As the accusations proved true, BaFin itself was put under scrutiny a year later.

In November 2020, the European Securities and Markets Authority (ESMA) published the results of its review which assessed the events leading to the collapse of Wirecard AG and the supervisory response by BaFin. This review identifies a number of deficiencies, inefficiencies and legal and procedural impediments relating to the following areas: the independence of BaFin from issuers and government; market monitoring by both BaFin and the Financial Reporting Enforcement Panel (FREP); examination procedures of FREP; and the effectiveness of the supervisory system in the area of financial reporting.

In April 2021, German prosecutors in Frankfurt announced the opening of a criminal investigation into BaFin's supervision of Wirecard.

In May 2022, the Federal Ministry of Finance gave BaFin more leeway and independence in conducting its work. According to new cooperation principles between the two authorities, BaFin is to only inform the ministry in critical cases, for example when a large corporation is involved or if there is an impact on financial markets stability.

Organization

BaFin is run by a Board consisting of the president and four executive directors for securities, banking supervision, insurance supervision and cross-functional areas and internal administration.

In addition to these divisions, the so-called "operational pillars", there are a number of departments that have cross-organizational or perform administrative tasks, such as "risk modeling", "money laundering" and "international responsibilities".

BaFin employs roughly 2,530 at its two offices and is fully funded by fees and levies of the supervised institutions and companies and so is independent of the federal budget. The levy amounts depend on the scope and authorization of total assets. An appeal to the Constitutional Court regarding the unconstitutionality of this (forced) levy in 2009 was rejected as unfounded. In the opinion of the court, the levy is 'intended to strengthen investor confidence and the soundness and integrity of these companies. These are a necessary condition for a functioning financial framework'.

As of December 2014, BaFin regulated approximately 1,780 banks, 676 financial services institutions, 573 insurance companies, 31 pension funds, 6,000 domestic investment funds and 260 investment companies.

Responsibilities
The main task of BaFin is the supervision of banks, insurance companies, and the trading of securities and ensure the viability, integrity, and stability of the German financial system.

As a financial market-based institution BaFin is responsible for both providers and consumers. On the supply side, it pays attention to the solvency of banks, insurance companies, and financial institutions. For investors, bank customers, and the insured it ensures confidence in the financial markets and the companies operating therein.

Accounts supervision
To maintain the integrity and stability of the financial system and combat money laundering BaFin is obliged, under the Banking Act, to run a centralized computer system that stores information on all accounts and their account holders. This information must be provided to BaFin by all financial institutions in Germany.

Banking
The Banking Act (KWG) is the legal basis for banking supervision by BaFin. It monitors compliance with the rules and guidelines of the Banking Act relating to credit and financial institutions.

The establishment of new banks in Germany is subject to a compulsory license subject to law, BaFin, as the competent authority, approves such licenses. It takes into account the management, minimum capital requirements, reliability, solid leadership, and the sustainability of the business when approving licenses.

Throughout their operation, financial institutions are subject to ongoing supervision by the BaFin. This is to ensure all conditions are met. In particular, the financial condition of solvency and liquidity, including having appropriate risk control - and management systems as described in the MaRisk-circulaire.

Financial institutions must provide BaFin with;
the financial statements and audit reports
the banks and financial service Kurzbilanzen
monthly reports on wholesale and retail loans
regularly demonstrations their compliance with the liquidity and solvency regulation

All information will be assessed and evaluated in close cooperation with the Deutsche Bundesbank. In addition, BaFin may order special tests, which are also carried out by members of the Bundesbank on the spot.

The Banking Law provides BaFin an extensive arsenal of sanctions including criminal sanctions, ranging from written warnings of fines to withdrawal of banking license.

Insurance
Similar to bank supervision, the Insurance Supervision Law (VAG) requires insurance companies to receive and maintain their business with the approval of BaFin, and the conditions are similar to those of banking supervision. BaFin supervises insurance companies (including pension and burial funds), holding companies, security, and pension funds. This excludes insurers that operate in only one province. These are subject to supervision by the competent local authority.

The supervisor shall include the monitoring of security assets and solvency to ensure that insurance contracts can be met. BaFin also monitors in general compliance with all laws applicable to the operation of insurance businesses.

Securities
BaFin is required to ensure the functioning of the German markets for securities and derivatives in accordance with the Securities Trading Act (WpHG). This includes in particular the prevention of insider trading and other market abuses such as price and market manipulation.

As part of this BaFin collects information on all securities traded as well as disclosures from listed companies from all market participants. This information is used to detect insider trading, price, and market manipulation. In particular, the buying and selling of shares by company management in the same company is monitored closely (Directors Dealings). BaFin also ensures market transparency by supervising reporting rules and disclosure requirements and makes sure these are followed.

BaFin enforcement powers range from the issuing of subpoenas and questioning people, suspending or prohibition trading in financial instruments up to being able to forward cases to the public prosecutor.

Since 2002, under the Securities Acquisition and Takeover Act, it also deals with monopoly issues during mergers and acquisitions.

BaFin acts as the central depository for prospectus, however, BaFin only checks basic information and does not check for the accuracy and creditworthiness of the issuer.

The role of the BaFin in law enforcement
BaFin is in effect a law enforcement agency and can initiate legal action. It has the right, when it discovers a crime or even the suspicion of a crime, in particular insider trading, market manipulation, illegal operation of banking, financial fraud, or incitement to establish stock exchange speculation, to forward them to law enforcement authorities. BaFin also has the power to remove the top leaders of a bank, suspend shareholders’ voting rights or appoint an outside supervisor to oversee management.

In the past, BaFin has hardly ever made use of its enforcement powers and typically resolved issues discreetly with any bank. Notably, the agency appointed special representatives with executive authority to help to run the European arm of VTB Bank (2022) and the German unit of Ziraat Bank (2022). 

In 2016, BaFin opened a new office dedicated to corporate whistleblowers, aiming to encourage more business insiders to expose wrongdoing. The new office centralizes the collection of details from whistleblowers and follows a special protocol to ensure identities are kept secret. It can also be contacted anonymously under the procedure.

Notable cases
In 2021, BaFin fined Deutsche Bank 8.66 million euros ($9.77 million) for controls related to the Euribor interest rate, the first fine imposed under a 2018 regulation that seeks to prevent manipulation of Euribor. 

In 2022, BaFin fined Bank of America 5.1 million euros ($5.28 million) for delays in reporting voting rights notifications.

Criticism
Soon after its establishment, there were signs that there were serious shortcomings within the internal structure of BaFin. The Examination by the Federal Koblenz noted in March 2004 that the internal control system of authority is insufficient.

In 2006, the Federal Court revealed the embezzlement of more than 4 million euro by Michael Raumann, the former head of information technology at BaFin, for which he was indicted and convicted by the Bonn district court. In the sentencing notes the court criticized BaFin for its "nonexistent" internal controls.

In September 2006 a report by PricewaterhouseCoopers and BaFin internal audit found that the requirements of the federal government to prevent corruption had not been implemented.

BaFin list of default risk of German banks
In April 2009 an internal BaFin list containing the volume of loans and securities "from troubled business” and banks was leaked to the newspaper Sueddeutsche Zeitung. The internal paper estimated the volume of debt to be 816 billion euros. This confidential information was seen as potentially damaging to the creditworthiness of the banks and their sustainability and was seen as a serious breach by BaFin.

Shortly after the publication of the information, BaFin asked the Munich public prosecutor's to raise a criminal complaint against persons unknown on suspicion of breach of statutory duty of confidentiality.

Bafin created a working group together with the Federal Lawyer’s Chamber, Assessor accountant, notaries, tax advisers and public accountants. The main objective of this group is to define “indications of possible money laundering activities” in connection with the work of the professions represented in this group. Furthermore, the Federal Chamber is in the process of establishing special Guidelines for its members, particularly in the interpretation of the Money Laundering Act.

Wirecard 

Accusations of suspect accounting at Wirecard were levelled in 2008, 2015 and 2016 and 2019. Each time Wirecard alleged market manipulation, sparking investigations by BaFin which defended the company. Wirecard wound up in 2020 and its CEO was arrested, sparking criticism of BaFin itself. The Federal Ministry of Finance later disclosed that one fifth of BaFin staff had engaged in some kind of investment activity in 2019 and 2020, with an increasing interest in Wirecard in the months ahead of its collapse. Only in September 2020, BaFin banned its staff from trading shares and other securities of the companies that it oversees.

See also
Deutsche Bundesbank
Federal agency (Germany)
K1 fund, a German ponzi scheme that the BaFin tried to shut down
Securities Commission

References

External links

DW Documentary on Wirecard scandal

Banking in Germany
German federal agencies
Government agencies established in 2002
2002 establishments in Germany
Financial regulatory authorities of Germany